Dafni Troulloi is a Cypriot women's association football club based in Troulloi, located in the Larnaca District. Its stadium is the Troulloi Community Stadium and its colours are green and white. The team is competing in Cypriot First Division (women).

Previous it had a men association football team which had 1 participation in Cypriot Fourth Division. In 2015 the men's team merged with Sourouklis Troullon to form Troulloi FC 2015.

References
 

Defunct football clubs in Cyprus
Association football clubs established in 1952
1952 establishments in Cyprus
Women's football clubs in Cyprus